Tipula pustulata is a species of True Craneflies.

Distribution
Andorra, Belgium, France, Germany, Portugal & Spain.

References

 

Tipulidae
Diptera of Europe